The Hebraization of surnames (also Hebraicization) (Ivrut, "Hebraization") is the act of adopting a Hebrew surname in exchange for a diaspora name. For many diaspora Jews who migrated to Israel, taking a Hebrew surname was a way to erase remnants of their diaspora experience and to assimilate into a new shared Jewish identity with Mizrahi Jews and Palestinian Jews (Jewish residents of Ottoman Syria and Mandatory Palestine) and later as Israeli Jews (Jewish citizens of the independent State of Israel).

The name change typically did not apply to Mizrahi Jews, who came from neighboring countries like Iran, Iraq, and Egypt and usually kept their surnames.

The phenomenon was especially common among Ashkenazi Jews, because many such families acquired permanent surnames (rather than patronyms) only when surnames were made compulsory by the November 12, 1787 decree by Habsburg Emperor Joseph II. Sephardi Jews from the Iberian peninsula often had hereditary family names since well before the expulsion from Spain (e.g., Cordovero, Abrabanel, Shaltiel, de Leon, Alcalai, Toledano, Lopez).

Very few Hebrew surnames existed before Hebraization, such as Cohen (priest), Moss (Moses) and Levi (Levite). Several Hebrew surnames, such as Katz, Bogoraz, Ohl and Pak are in fact Hebrew acronyms even though they sound and are often perceived as being of non-Jewish origin (in these cases, from German, Russian, Polish and Korean, respectively).

Hebraization began as early as the days of the First and Second Aliyot and continued after the establishment of the State of Israel. The widespread trend towards Hebraization of surnames in the days of the Yishuv and immediately after the establishment of the State of Israel was based on the claim that a Hebrew name provided a feeling of belonging to the new state. There was also the wish to distance from the lost and dead past and from the forced imposition of foreign (e.g. German) names in the previous centuries.

The process has not ended: among the thousands of Israelis who currently apply for legal name changes each year, many do so to adopt Hebrew names. A similar phenomenon was observed with Latvian surnames, whose de-Germanization was part of the Latvian national movement during the interbellum.

History

In the Yishuv
Among the Yishuv (the first to return to Eretz Yisrael—the Land of Israel), there was a strong feeling of sh'lilat ha-golah (Hebrew:  "negation of the diaspora/Exile"), which often included the exchange of Diaspora surnames for purely Hebrew ones. Part of the Zionist movement was not only aliyah, it was also wanting to create an image of an Israeli Jew that would be different from the stereotypical perception of Yiddish-speaking, shtetl-living, weak Diaspora Jews, and these things were a significant part of the people of the First and Second Aliyot. Some of the immigrants of the First Aliyah (1882–1903) Hebraized their surnames, and the practice became widespread during the Second Aliyah (1904–1914).

Jewish Agency booklet

This process started with individuals like Eliezer Ben-Yehuda (Perelman) and was adopted by the New Yishuv. Before the founding of the State of Israel, in 1944, the Zionist leadership and the Jewish National Council proclaimed it the "Year of naturalization and the Hebrew name". A special committee under the chairmanship of Mordechai Nemzabi, the Jewish Agency advisor on matters of civilian defense, published a booklet which contained guidelines on the creation on new Hebrew surnames.

Changing a foreign surname to Hebrew
Change of vocalization: Leib becomes Lev
Change of consonants: Borg or Brog becomes Barak
Shortening by omitting the ending: Rosenberg becomes Rosen
Shortening a name with a Hebrew meaning, by omitting the foreign suffix: Yakobovitch (Jacobowitz, Jacobowicz) becomes Ya'akovi
Translating the foreign name into Hebrew according to the meaning: Abramovich (Abramowicz, Abramowitz) becomes Ben Avraham
First names as surnames
Name of a father or mother who were murdered during the Shoah, thus: Bat Miriam, Ben Moshe, Devorin
Son or daughter who fell in battle: Avinoam
Brother or sister who were killed or fell: Achimeir
Beloved or admired biblical figure: Shaul, Davidi
Change of names by names of places, plants or sites in Eretz Yisrael
Places or sites: Hermoni, Eilat, Gilad
Plants, especially plants of the Land of Israel: Eshel ("orchard", "garden"), Rotem ("retama")

After the establishment of Israel
After the Israeli Declaration of Independence, there was still the attitude that the hebraization of family names should continue, in order to get rid of names with a diaspora sound. Hebraization of names became a typical part of the integration process for new immigrants among Ashkenazi Jews. It also occurred among Sephardi and Mizrahi Jewish immigrants from Arab and Muslim lands, though it was less common among them than among Ashkenazi Jews; Sephardi and Mizrahi children were typically given new Hebrew names in school, often without permission from their parents.

David Ben-Gurion, the first Prime Minister of Israel, was committed to the use of the Hebrew language (he changed his surname from Grün to Ben-Gurion). He tried to convince as many people to change their surnames into "real" Hebrew ones. Ben-Gurion got Herzl Rosenblum to sign the Israeli Declaration of Independence as Herzl Vardi, his pen name (later changed to his legal name), as Ben-Gurion wanted more Hebrew names on the document. Nine more of the signatories of the document would then go on to Hebraize their name, as well.

Ben-Gurion, in an order to the Israel Defense Forces soldiers, wrote, "It is desirable that every commanding officer (from Squadron Commander to Chief of Staff) should change his surname, whether German, English, Slavic, French or foreign in general, to a Hebrew surname, in order to be a role model for his soldiers. The Israel Defense Forces must be Hebrew in spirit, vision, and in all internal and external expressions." For a while it was widespread for new conscripts into the Israel Defense Forces with Ashkenazi surnames to Hebraize their names upon entering service. Among the people who did this is former Israeli Prime Minister Ehud Barak, who changed his surname from Brog to Barak upon being drafted in 1972.

A binding order of the same issue was issued to the officials of the state in 1950, and particularly to those who represented the State abroad. A "Committee for Hebrew Names" was established to supervise the implementation of the order, whose task was to assist and advise the choice of a Hebrew name.

In addition to pressure from the state, tensions between Jewish ethnic groups caused some people to Hebraize their names to dis-identify with a "stigmatized" ethnic group or to merge into a "collective Israeli identity" and therefore created a desire to Hebraize.

Supporters and opponents
The Hebraization of surnames was a source of debate in the days of the Yishuv and after the establishment of the State of Israel.

Supporters
Among the most significant supporters was Yitzhak Ben Zvi (Shimshelevich), leader of the Labor movement, historian and second president of the State of Israel. He was born in Ukraine on 24 November 1884. He studied law in Istanbul together with David Ben Gurion. In 1906 he attended the founding conference of the Poalei Zion and in 1907 he settled in the Land of Israel. He belonged to the founders of the Ahdut ha-Avodah Party, was active in the Haganah, a member of the Jewish National Council, and signed the Israeli Declaration of Independence. Ben Zvi died in 1963.

Ben Zvi wrote:

All rabbinic authorities encourage hebraizing first names (VaYikra Rabba 32, and Kor'ei Sh'mo, pp. 173–181), and some actively encourage last names, as well (Rabbi Shlomo Aviner (Resp. She'elat Shlomo VIII, 67–68), and even did so themselves: among them: Rabbis Menashe HaKatan (Klein), Maharam Schick, Shlomo Goren (Goronchick), Shaul Yisraeli (Israelite), Moshe Zvi Neria (Menkin), Shlomo Aviner (Langenauer).

Opponents
One of the opponents of the Hebraization of surnames was Moses Calvary, a writer and teacher. Born in Germany in 1883, he received a traditional, general, and rabbinical education. He was a member of Ahdut Ha'avodah, an educator in the Meir Shfeya youth village, principal of Gymnasia Rehavia in Jerusalem, and educator in the "Ahava" youth village in Kiryat Bialik.

Some people were emotionally attached to their diaspora last name, for reasons such as it having noble yichus (origins), or for a desire to continue to identify with their ethnic group. There is story of an Israeli diplomat who told David Ben-Gurion, "I will change my name if you can find me one non-Jew named Lifshitz." Others had names that were entirely Hebrew to begin with.

The disagreement about the Hebraization of surnames continued. Many people preserved their foreign surname, such as first President of Israel Chaim Weizmann, President of the Supreme Court of Israel Shimon Agranat, and others.

Decline of Hebraization
This trend moderated with time. By the time of the wave of immigration from the former Soviet Union in the 1990s, the practice was waning. The Soviet immigration wave clearly had the effect of weakening the practice of Hebraizing names—as part of the marked general tendency of these immigrants to cling to their specific Russian linguistic and cultural identity which included many names of Yiddish origin. A conspicuous example is the former (2009–2013) Israeli Minister of Tourism, Stas Misezhnikov. Though an outspoken Israeli nationalist on other issues, Misezhnikov did not feel impelled to change his clearly Slavic surname (nor his equally Slavic first name), and there was no public pressure on him to do so—as there would have been on an Israeli minister during the country's first decades.

However, even today, people continue to Hebraize their surname, especially those serving in the IDF and Israel's diplomatic missions, representing the State of Israel. The number of those who do is small but significant; about 15% of American and British immigrants to Israel who come on Nefesh B'Nefesh flights Hebraize their names on arrival.

There is also a trend of reverting to ancestral, non-Hebrew names to return to one's roots and preserve traditions unique to each ethnic group. There are people who re-adopt the name their family previously abandoned for the sake of "Israeliness", such as Israeli writer Yitzhak Orpaz who restored his family's original family name of "Averbuch".

Choosing a name
There were several ways people Hebraized their names.

Some names were words that were directly translated from the corresponding Diaspora name.

Others were direct translations of patronymic names or names based on biblical figures.

Other names were translated from toponyms.

Other names were the negation of so-called "Ekelnamen" (literally "disgusting names" in German, deliberately insulting or demeaning last names forced upon ancestors by non-Jewish officials).

Other names were Hebraized on their similar sounding to a Hebrew word or name, though sometimes their phonetic similarity was far-fetched.

Sometimes, there were prevalent options between either translating it, or choosing a name based on similar sound (homophone).

In some cases, a false cognate could satisfy both options at once.

Others chose completely newly chosen names, many times symbolic in nature.

Others kept their name for several reasons. Sometimes, the reason it was kept was because of its religious nature. For examples, names connected with the kohen (priesthood) such as Cohen, Kohn, Kaplan, Sacerdoti, Katz, Azoulai, etc. Other times it indicated Levite descent such as Levi, Levy, Weil (anagram), and Segal (Hebrew acronym). Other times it was synagogue or Jewish community functions such as Gabbai, Chazan, or Rabin. Sometimes the surname was already Hebrew (Sarfati).

Others kept their name for its yichus (meaning that the person descends from something akin to "good stock"), which gave the bearer more reason not to Hebraize it. Examples include Horowitz (famous rabbinical dynasty), Rothschild (famous Jewish banking dynasty), Einstein (famous bearer), or Shaltiel (ancient Sephardic family tracing its origins to King David—and it is already Hebrew).

Others kept their name but the name underwent some mutation because they contained sounds that do not exist in Hebrew. Examples include Lando (from "Landau"), and Glober (from "Glauber").

Other "Diaspora" Jewish names are Hebrew to begin with (such as Ashkenazi and Yerushalmi), corruptions of Hebrew words (such as Heifetz, from Chafetz), Hebrew acronyms (such as Shalit, from "Sheyihye le'orekh yamim tovim), or of Aramaic origin (such as Kahane, or Raban).

See also
 Anglicisation of names
 Hebrew name
 Jewish name
 Jewish surname

References

 Hebraization
 Hebraization
Language revival
Hebrew language
 
Cultural assimilation